Roslund & Hellström were a Swedish duo of crime fiction writers composed of journalist Anders Roslund (born 1961) and activist and author Börge Hellström (1957–2017). They were full-time writers from 2004 to Hellström's death in 2017. 

Beforehand, Roslund had worked for 15 years as a news reporter for Rapport News, Aktuellt, and Kulturnyheterna. Hellström, an ex-convict, was one of the founders of Kriminellas Revansch i Samhället (KRIS), an organisation devoted to rehabilitating former criminals.

The duo made their debut with the crime novel Odjuret (English translation: The Beast) in 2004. Their novels put a particular emphasis on the roles of victim and perpetrator, offering a morally grey portrayal of motive and responsibility.

Their works have been translated into Japanese, Chinese, Korean, Indonesian, Russian, English, German, French, Italian, Spanish, Portuguese, Dutch, Polish, Lithuanian, Estonian, Romanian, Bulgarian, Slovenian, Croatian, Hungarian, Slovak, Czech, Icelandic, Finnish, Danish, Norwegian, Hebrew, Turkish, Greek, Macedonian, and Catalan.

Bibliography
Odjuret (2004, published in English as The Beast)
Box 21  (2005, published in English in England as The Vault and in the United States  as Box 21)
Edward Finnigans upprättelse (2006, published in English in 2011 as Cell 8)
Flickan under gatan (2007)
Tre sekunder (2009, published in English in 2010 as Three Seconds)
Två soldater (2012, published in English in 2013 as Two Soldiers)
Tre Minuter (2016, published in English in 2017 as Three Minutes)

Prizes, awards and recognition
 Awarded Glasnyckeln (The Glass Key Award) in 2005 for Odjuret
 Nominated for Best Swedish Crime Novel in 2005 by Svenska Deckarakademin for Box 21
 Awarded Stockholm City Newspaper's Book of the Year in 2005 for Box 21 
 Awarded Guldpocket (Gold Pocket) for The Year's Most Sold Swedish Crime Novel (more than 50 000 copies sold) in 2005 for Odjuret
 Nominated for Best Swedish Crime Novel in 2006 by Svenska Deckarakademin for Edward Finnigans upprättelse
 Awarded Platinapocket (The Platinum Pocket) for The Year's Most Sold Swedish Crime Novel (more than 100,000 copies sold) in 2006 for Box 21
 Awarded Best Romanian Crime Novel by Romanian Crime Writers Club - Box 21
 Nominated for Bookseller's Prize - Box 21 
 Awarded Platinapocket (The Platinum Pocket) for The Year's Most Sold Swedish Crime Novel (more than 100,000 copies sold) in 2007 for "Edward Finnigans Upprättelse"
 Nominated for Bookseller's Prize - "Edward Finnigans Upprättelse"
 Nominated for Best Swedish Crime Novel in 2007 by Svenska Deckarakademin for Flickan under gatan
 Awarded Platinapocket (The Platinum Pocket) for The Year's Most Sold Swedish Crime Novel (more than 100,000 copies sold) in 2008 for "Flickan Under Gatan"
 Awarded Best Swedish Crime Novel 2010 - "Tre Sekunder"
 Recognized on the New York Times list of Notable Crime Fiction for 2009
 Awarded The Great Reader's Prize 2010 - "Tre Sekunder"
 Nominated for Glasnyckeln (The Glass Key Award) in 2010 for 'Tre Sekunder''
 Awarded Platinapocket (The Platinum Pocket) for The Year's Most Sold Swedish Crime Novel (more than 100,000 copies sold) in 2010 for "Tre Sekunder"
 Awarded The CWA International Dagger 2011 for The Best translated crime, thriller, suspense or spy fiction novel, for UK publication. - "Three Seconds"
 Nominated for The Barry Award for Best Britisth Crime Novel 2011 - "Three Seconds"
 Nominated for Best Swedish Crime Novel 2013 - "Två Soldater"
 Nominated for The CWA International Dagger 2013 for The Best translated crime, thriller, suspense or spy fiction novel, for UK publication. - "Two Soldiers"
 Nominated for Best Swedish Crime Novel 2013 - "Tre Minuter"

See also

 True crime

References

External links 
 
 Three Seconds and Roslund & Hellström discussion forum
 Piratförlaget's website
 The Salomonsson Agency

Swedish male writers
Swedish crime fiction writers
Writing duos